The 2003–04 Irish Cup was the 124th edition of Northern Ireland's premier football knock-out cup competition. It concluded on 1 May 2004 with the final.

Coleraine were the defending champions, winning their 5th Irish Cup last season after a 1–0 win over Glentoran in the 2003 final. This season the same two clubs reached the final again. A 1–0 victory for Glentoran, who were appearing in the final for the sixth time in nine years was enough to seal their 20th Irish Cup win.

Fifth round

|}

Replays

|}

Sixth round

|}

Replays

|}

Quarter-finals

|}

Replay

|}

Semi-finals

|}

Final

References

2003–04
2003–04 domestic association football cups
Cup